Miloš N. Đurić  (Serbian Cyrillic: Милош Н. Ђурић), was a Serbian classical philologist, hellenist, classical translator, philosopher, university professor and a full member of Serbian Academy of Sciences and Arts. Đurić's textbooks and  translations of classic literary works such as the Iliad, the Odyssey and Poetics are still in use. According to Dr. Ksenija Maricki Gađanski, Đurić's numerous contributions to Serbian culture puts him on a scale of earlier Serbian enlighteners such as Saint Sava and Dositej Obradović.

Biography
Born the eldest son of a family of eight, Đurić's  father, Nikola, was a teacher and writer who introduced him to Serbian epic poetry, which would influence his future career. He began to write and publish poetry and literary criticism early in life. In 1918, Đurić was living in Osijek, where he tried to publish a work on Serbian epic poetry titled Smrt majke Jugovića. Austro-Hungarian state censors based in Osijek banned the paper on the grounds that it "threatens the national interests". Đurić graduated from the University of Belgrade Faculty of Philosophy and defended his PhD thesis at the University of Zagreb in 1929.

He worked as a teacher at a gymnasium in Zemun and Sremska Mitrovica where he published poems and essays in a local journal Serbia. He went on to work as a university professor teaching the history of Ancient Greek literature, a post which he held for four decades.

The puppet government of Serbia forced him into early retirement and sent him to the Banjica concentration camp. His only son Rastko died on the front in Slavonia in 1945. Đurić dedicated all of his works from that point on to him.

The Kornelije Stanković Musical Society of Belgrade elected him a full member, and Đurić later served as the president of the organisation. Between 1952 and 1957 Đurić served as the president of the Serbian Literary Guild, chief editor of several academic journals and a contributor to 96 journals and magazines. The Belgrade Psychoanalytical Society made him a full member, and he translated some of the most influential works of psychoanalytical literature into Serbian.

A complete bibliography of Đurić's works consists of around 400 titles containing more than 10,000 pages.

Ethics professor
The World War II puppet government of Serbia demanded that notable intellectuals sign a document that demanded "order and obedience" from them and "patriotism in the fight against communists". Đurić refused to sign it on the grounds that more than half of his students were part of the Yugoslav Partisans. When a music professor stopped him and warned him the Germans would not forget his disobedience, Đurić answered: "It's easy for you. You play diple, while I teach students ethics!" This statement became a symbol of personal integrity in Serbian and Yugoslav society.

Awards and legacy
Đurić was awarded the city of Belgrade's October Award, the Seventh July Award, the Order of Saint Sava and the Yugoslav Order of Labour. A street in Karaburma is named after him. The Association of Literary Translators of Serbia has awarded the Miloš N. Đurić Award annually since 1969. It is considered the most important Serbian prize for translation. Mihailo Pupin wrote highly of his work and philosophy. The title of one of Milovan Vitezović's poetry collections—Na času kod profesora Miloša N. Đurića—honours him.

His personal items and works are kept by the Belgrade University Library.

Works

Original works
Vidovdanska etika, 1914
Smrt Majke Jugovića, 1918
Filosofija panhumanizma, 1922
Mit o sunčevoj sestri, 1925
Pred slovenskim vidicima, 1928
Racionalizam u savremenoj nemačkoj filosofiji, 1928
Problemi filosofije kulture, 1929
Ogledi iz grčke filosofije i umetnosti, 1936
Etika i politika u Eshilovoj tragediji, 1937
Aristotelovo etičko učenje, 1940
Helenska agonistika i likovne umetnosti, 1940
Istorija helenske književnosti u vremenu političke samostalnosti, 1951
Sofisti i njihov istorijski značaj, sa bibl. dotadašnjih radova, 1955
Kroz helensku istoriju, književnost i muziku (studije i ogledi), 1955
Sofoklove tebanske tragedije, 1955
Istorija starih Grka do smrti Aleksandra Makedonskog, 1955
Na izvorima umetničke lepote, ogledi o Homeru, 1957
Iz helenskih riznica (essays), 1959
Aristotel, 1959
Platonova akademija i njen politički rad, 1960
Istorija helenske etike, 1961
Patnja i mudrost, 1962
Značenje izraza "radojički" u pesmi Do pojasa Laze Kostića, 1968
Antologija stare helenske lirike, 1962
Istorijski izvori istorija i filosofija, 1997
Selected works, I-VI, 1997

Translator and editor
 Iliad, Homer
 Odyssey, Homer
 Poetics, Aristotel
 The Suppliant, Aeschylus
 The Persians, Aeschylus
 Seven Against Thebes, Aeschylus
 Prometheus Bound, Aeschylus
 Oresteia, Aeschylus
 Antigon, Sophocles
 Oedipus Rex, Sophocles
 Medea, Euripides
 Hippolytu, Euripides
 Iphigenia in Tauris, Euripides
 Daphnis and Chloe, Longus
 Symposium, Plato
 Ion, Plato
 Apology, Plato
 Phaedrus, Plato
 Phaedo, Plato
 Crito, Plato
 Criticism of Parallel Lives, Plutarch
 Enchiridion of Epictetus, Arrian
 De Vita Beata, Seneca the Younger
 Epistulae Morales ad Lucilium, Seneca the Younger
 Grčke tragedije, a compilation, 1982
Various shorter works by Alfred Adler, Carl Jung, Maxim Gorky, Will Durant, Nikolai Berdyaev and Rabindranath Tagore
 Srpske narodne pesme, I-XIV, editor
 Srpske narodne pripovetke, I-II, editor
Antologija stare helenske lirike, 1962, editor

See also
 Milan Kujundžić Aberdar
 Jovan Došenović
 Vladimir Jovanović
 Božidar Knežević
 Svetozar Marković
 Dimitrije Matić
 Ljubomir Nedić
 Milan Budimir
 Emanuilo Janković
 Laza Kostić
 Branislav Petronijević
 Mita Rakić

References

Further reading
Bibliografija Miloša N. Đurića by Živanov Marko and Sajić Radisav, 1983
Zvezdani časovi Miloša N. Đurića by Jokić Miroslav, 2014

External links
 RTS documentary on Miloš N. Đurić

1892 births
1967 deaths
Serbs of Croatia
Members of the Serbian Orthodox Church
Recipients of the Order of St. Sava
Serbian writers
Academic staff of the University of Belgrade
20th-century Serbian historians
Austro-Hungarian Serbs
Yugoslav historians
Serbian classical scholars
Serbian humanities academics
Members of the Serbian Academy of Sciences and Arts
Translators of Homer